A coastal plain is flat, low-lying land adjacent to a sea coast. A fall line commonly marks the border between a coastal plain and a piedmont area. Some of the largest coastal plains are in Alaska and the southeastern United States. The Atlantic Coastal Plain runs from the New York Bight to Florida.

The Coastal Plains of India lie on either side of the Deccan Plateau, along the western and eastern coasts of India.  They extend for about 6,150 km from the Rann of Kutch in the west to West Bengal in the east. They are broadly divided into the Western Coastal Plains and the Eastern Coastal Plains. The two coastal plains meet at Kanyakumari, the southernmost tip of the Indian mainland. The eastern coastal plain is located between The Bay of Bengal and the eastern Ghats and the western coastal plain is located between the Arabian Sea and the western Ghats.

See also 
 Alluvial plain
 Atlantic Plain
 Coastal plains of Chile
 Cumberland Plain, Australia 
 Israeli coastal plain
 Mississippi embayment
 North European Plain

References

Slope landforms
Coastal and oceanic landforms